Ezequiel Jurado (born Rosario, 17 April 1973) is a former Argentine rugby union player. He played as a fullback.

Jurado played for Jockey Club de Rosario.

He had 28 caps for Argentina, scoring 6 tries, 30 points on aggregate, from the 53-7 loss to Australia, at 30 April 1995, in Brisbane, in a friendly game, to the 26-36 loss to Wales, at 5 June 1999, in Buenos Aires, in another friendly game. He was called for the 1995 Rugby World Cup, playing in three games but remaining scoreless. He had been pre-selected for the 1999 Rugby World Cup, but was left outside the final team.

References

External links

1973 births
Living people
Argentine rugby union players
Argentina international rugby union players
Rugby union fullbacks
Sportspeople from Rosario, Santa Fe